South Tongu is one of the constituencies represented in the Parliament of Ghana. It elects one Member of Parliament (MP) by the first past the post system of election. South Tongu is located in the South Tongu district  of the Volta Region of Ghana.

Boundaries
The seat is located within the South Tongu District of the Volta Region of Ghana.

Members of Parliament

Elections

See also
List of Ghana Parliament constituencies

Notes

References 

Adam Carr's Election Archives
Ghana Home Page

Parliamentary constituencies in the Volta Region